The Captain General of the Sea was the wartime commander-in-chief of the Venetian navy.

History
The post of Captain General of the Sea was filled only during wartime, by election by the Great Council of Venice, usually from one of the members of the Venetian patriciate with long experience in naval affairs, although occasionally younger or less militarily experienced men were selected.  During the later 17th century, the considerable expenses that the office entailed made the wealth of the candidates an important factor in their selection. 

Like all Venetian officials, the Captain General of the Sea was answerable to the councils composing the Venetian government (such as the Great Council or the Signoria) that set actual policy, but otherwise enjoyed comprehensive authority over all naval commanders and officials, as well as officials in the overseas colonies for matters pertaining to the fleet. When deciding on issues of strategy and tactics, however, he was constrained to obey the decisions of the war council, taken by majority vote.

Even after the other major European navies, the Venetian fleet, and even the Venetians' major naval rivals, the Ottoman Navy, began using mostly sail ships of the line during the 17th century, the tradition-minded Venetians insisted, despite heavy debate, to keep a galley as the Captain General's flagship. Only two exceptions to this are known, in 1617 and in 1715. The crew of the flagship enjoyed special privileges, and was exempted from the usual deductions of pay for the coverings of the rowing benches. They also received free of charge a red coat, red breeches, and a red cap. In combat the flagship took position in the centre of the Venetian formation.

Notable holders
 Jacopo Dondulo, during the War of Saint Sabas
 Antonio Grimani, during the Second Ottoman–Venetian War 
 Lazzaro Mocenigo, during the Fifth Ottoman–Venetian War
 Francesco Morosini, in 1654-1655, during the Fifth Ottoman–Venetian War (Cretan War), and then also at the beginning of the Sixth Ottoman–Venetian War (Morean War).
 Benedetto Pesaro, during the Second Ottoman–Venetian War
 Andrea Pisani, during the Seventh Ottoman–Venetian War
 Sebastiano Venier, during the Battle of Lepanto (Fourth Ottoman–Venetian War)
 Girolamo Zane, during the early phase of the Fourth Ottoman–Venetian War
 Carlo Zeno, at the Battle of Modon (1403)

References

Sources
 
 

Military ranks of the Venetian navy
Commanders in chief
Republic of Venice admirals